Gemona del Friuli is a railway station serving the town of Gemona del Friuli, in the region of Friuli-Venezia Giulia, northern Italy. The station opened on 15 November 1875 and is located on the Pontebbana railway (Udine–Tarvisio) and Gemona del Friuli-Casarsa railway. The train services are operated by Trenitalia and ÖBB.

History
The station was inaugurated on 15 November 1875 when the railway line from Udine opened.

On 18 December 1876 the line was extended to the station of Carnia. It took until 1 November 1914 for Gemona to be connected with Pinzano, completing the railway line from Casarsa.

In 1992 the doubling of the line from Artegna was completed, which involved the reconstruction of the station and the adjacent service yard.

Train services
The station is served by the following service(s):

Regional services (REX) Villach - Tarvisio - Carnia - Gemona del Friuli - Udine
Regional services (Treno regionale) Tarvisio - Carnia - Gemona del Friuli - Udine - Cervignano del Friuli - Trieste

Bus services

Tarvisio - Carnia - Gemona del Friuli - Udine
Maniago - Pinzano - Germona del Friuli

See also

History of rail transport in Italy
List of railway stations in Friuli-Venezia Giulia
Rail transport in Italy
Railway stations in Italy

References

 This article is based upon a translation of the Italian language version as of February 2016.

External links

Railway stations in Friuli-Venezia Giulia